Sirkka Turkka (2 February 1939 – 23 October 2021) was a Finnish poet and recipient of the Finlandia Prize in 1987 and the Eino Leino Prize in 2000.

Works
Huone avaruudessa (1973)
Valaan vatsassa (1975)
Minä se olen (1976)
Yö aukeaa kuin vilja (1978)
Mies joka rakasti vaimoaan liikaa (1979)
Kaunis hallitsija (1981)
Vaikka on kesä (1983)
Teokset 1973–1983 (1985)
Tule takaisin, pikku Sheba (1986), translated into English by Seija Paddon: Not You, Not the Rain (1991)
Voiman ääni (1989), translated into English by Seija Paddon: The Sound of Strength (2000)
Sielun veli (1993)
Nousevan auringon talo (1997)
Tulin tumman metsän läpi (1999)
Niin kovaa se tuuli löi (2004)
Runot 1973–2004 (2005)

References

Finnish women poets
Recipients of the Eino Leino Prize
1939 births
2021 deaths
Writers from Helsinki
Finlandia Prize winners
International Writing Program alumni
20th-century Finnish poets
20th-century Finnish women writers
21st-century Finnish poets
21st-century Finnish women writers